Rui Pedro Machado Bandeira Raínho (born 27 June 1989) is a Portuguese footballer who plays for Anadia F.C. as a defender.

Football career
On 27 July 2014, Raínho made his professional debut with Freamunde in a 2014–15 Taça da Liga match against Covilhã.

References

External links

Stats and profile at LPFP 

1989 births
Living people
People from Aveiro, Portugal
Portuguese footballers
Association football defenders
Liga Portugal 2 players
S.C. Espinho players
G.D. Chaves players
S.C. Freamunde players
Anadia F.C. players
Portugal youth international footballers
Sportspeople from Aveiro District